Morse House may refer to:

in Hong Kong
Morse House, The Scout Association of Hong Kong#Headquarters

in the United States
Morse-Skinner Ranch House, Lodi, CA, listed on the NRHP in California
LeGrand Morse House, Point Arena, CA, listed on the NRHP in California
Charles Copeland Morse House, Santa Clara, CA, listed on the NRHP in California
Burton Morse House, Twin Falls, ID, listed on the NRHP in Idaho
Robert Hosmer Morse House, Lake Forest, IL, listed on the NRHP in Illinois
Dr. Frederic D. Morse House, Lawrence, KS, listed on the NRHP in Kansas
Morse-Libby Mansion, Portland, ME, listed on the NRHP in Maine
Amos Morse House, Foxboro, MA, listed on the NRHP in Massachusetts
 Hastings-Morse House, Haverhill, MA, listed on the NRHP in Massachusetts
Moses Morse House, Methuen, MA, listed on the NRHP in Massachusetts
Daniel Morse III House, Sherborn, MA, listed on the NRHP in Massachusetts
Morse-Barber House, Sherborn, MA, listed on the NRHP in Massachusetts
Morse-Tay-Leland-Hawes House, Sherborn, MA, listed on the NRHP in Massachusetts
H. Morse House, Southbridge, MA, listed on the NRHP in Massachusetts
 Morse House (Taunton, Massachusetts), listed on the NRHP in Massachusetts
Henry Morse House, Taunton, MA, listed on the NRHP in Massachusetts
Timothy Morse House, West Newbury, MA, listed on the NRHP in Massachusetts
Tisdale-Morse House, Taunton, MA, listed on the NRHP in Massachusetts
Morse-Scoville House, Constantine, MI, listed on the NRHP in Michigan
Morse Jr., Elisha and Lizzie, House, Minneapolis, MN, listed on the NRHP in Minnesota
 Morse House (101 Fifth St., Dayton, Oregon), listed on the NRHP in Oregon
 Morse House (409 Oak St., Dayton, Oregon), listed on the NRHP in Oregon
Robert I. Morse House, Bellingham, WA, listed on the NRHP in Washington
Morse House (Grandview, Washington), listed on the NRHP in Washington

See also
Morse Farm (disambiguation)